Ajaaratou Satang Jow is a Gambian politician.

In the 1990s, Jow was a minister for education and for youth, sports, and culture in the Gambian government.

Jow served as Commissioner of the Sierra Leone Truth and Reconciliation Commission from May 2002 to April 2004.

References

Gambian politicians
Living people
Year of birth missing (living people)
Place of birth missing (living people)